Ina Lohr (1903 - 1983) was a Swiss composer, music teacher, and a founding member of Schola Cantorum Basiliensis.

Personal life and career
Lohr was born in Amsterdam in 1903. She studied the violin at Muziek-Lyceum Amsterdam and graduated from there in 1929 with a violin pedagogy degree. During a trip to Davos, Switzerland by train for a vacation, she felt weak and got off in Basel, where she decided to live in 1942. In 1930, Lohr became an assistant of Paul Sacher which heavily impacted her music career. Lohr later became a founding member and instructor of Schola Cantorum Basiliensis, where she taught Protestant church music and liturgy. In 1958, the University of Basel gave her an honorary doctorate in theology.

References

External links
Biography about Ina Lohr in the making

1903 births
1983 deaths
Swiss women composers
Swiss music educators
University of Basel alumni
20th-century women musicians
Women music educators